Walter Buchanan is the name of:

 Walter Clarke Buchanan (1838–1924), New Zealand politician
 Walter Buchanan (footballer) (1855–1926), England international footballer
 Walter Buchanan (musician) (1914–1988), American jazz musician
 Walter Buchanan (MP) (1797–1877), British Whig and Liberal politician